Marjan Sekulovski (born 13 March 1973) is a football head coach from the Republic of Macedonia, who is currently head coach of FK Pelister in the Macedonian First Football League.

Playing career
As a football player, Marjan Sekulovski played for: Pelister, FK Prespa, FK Novaci, FK Bitola, FK Borec and FK Napredok among other clubs.  Also, he played for Macedonian National Team (U-15 ; U-17 ; U-19). He played as the attacking (creative) midfielder position. 
He was one of the biggest talents in his generation, but he could not prove his talent because of his many injuries. 
Because of his last big injury (Achilles tendon), he finished his football career very young, at the age 28. In May 2001, he started his coaching career.

Managerial career 
 Marjan Sekulovski, in June 2001, at age 28, started his coaching career as Head Coach of the FK Pelister Youth Team, FK Pelister (U-15).
 In first three seasons, under him, FK Pelister Youth Team, 2001/2002 - FK Pelister (U-15), 2002/2003 - FK Pelister (U-16), 2003/2004 - FK Pelister (U-17), was three times, runners up, in Macedonian First Youth League (U-15, U-16, U-17).
 In May 2004, under him, FK Pelister (U-17), become Champion, Winner at the Macedonian National Cup U-17, in the season 2003-04.
 In June 2004, at age 31, Marjan Sekulovski became the youngest ever Head Coach in FK Pelister history.
 In June 2004, at age 31, he took over and coached the Professional Senior Team of the FK Pelister, in Macedonian Second League 2004-2005.
 From June 2005, he continued to coach the Professional Senior Team of the FK Pelister, in Macedonian Second League 2005-2006, guiding them to a Macedonian Second League title in the 2005-06 season. 
 In May 2006, FK Pelister became Champions in Macedonian Second League 2005-2006, for first time under him, with unbeaten record of 18 official matches in row.
 From June 2006, he continued to coach the Professional Senior Team of the FK Pelister in Macedonian First League 2006 - 2007.
 In his first season in Macedonian First League, 2006 - 2007, under him, FK Pelister finished on 5th position, and played 1/2 final match in National Cup.
 Marjan Sekulovski stay in FK Pelister until June 2007.
 In June 2007, he take over FK Sileks from Kratovo, Macedonian First League, and stay until November 2008.
 Starting from January 2009, he attended the education class for UEFA PRO DIPLOMA / LICENCE, and successfully finished in December 2010.
 In December 2010, Marjan Sekulovski has graduated the UEFA PRO DIPLOMA / LICENCE Football Head Coach class.
 In November 2009, he took over FK 11 Oktomvri from Prilep, Macedonian Second League, and stayed until June 2010.
 In December 2010, he took over FK Novaci from Novaci, Macedonian Second League, and stayed until June 2011.
 In September 2011, for the second time, he took over FK 11 Oktomvri from Prilep, Macedonian First League, and stayed until November 2011.
 In November 2011, Marjan Sekulovski returns to FK Pelister, guiding them to a Macedonian Second League title in the 2011-12 season.
 In May 2012, FK Pelister, became Champions, for second time under him,  in Macedonian Second League 2011-2012, with unbeaten record of 14 official matches in row.
 He stayed in FK Pelister until May 2012.
 In May 2012, Marjan Sekulovski left FK Pelister (Europa) and went to Myanmar (Asia), in Ayeyawady United FC (Myanmar), to manage his first international club in Ayeyawady United.
 In October 2012, first time under him, first time in history, Ayeyawady United FC,  become Champion, Winner the Myanmar National Cup 2012 (MFF Digicel Cup 2012), and qualified to play in AFC CUP 2013, in Group Stage.  
 In January 2013, under him, Ayeyawady United FC, was, runners up, in Myanmar Super Cup 2013.
 In period, February 2013 - May 2013, Ayeyawady United FC, under him, play in AFC Cup 2013 Group Stage.
 He stayed in Ayeyawady United FC until finishing his 18 months contract in November 2013.
 In March 2014, he take over FK Makedonija Gjorce Petrov from Skopje, Macedonian First League, and stayed until May 2014.
 In July 2014, for third time, he take over FK Pelister from Bitola, Macedonian First League, and stayed until December 2014.
 In December 2014, Macedonian Football Federation, awarded Marjan Sekulovski, the Best Macedonian Football Coach, who work abroad.
 In December 2014, for second time, he returned to the Myanmar team, Ayeyawady United FC. 
 In January 2015, under him, Ayeyawady United FC, become Champion, winning the Myanmar Super Cup 2015 (MFF Charity Cup 2015).
 In May 2015, under him, first time in history, Ayeyawady United FC successfully finished and pass the Group Stage in AFC CUP 2015, without losing match in Group Stage, with records of 2 wins, 4 draws, 0 lost, and positive + 4 goal difference with 13 scored goals and 9 conceded goals in 6 games and qualified to play 1/8 final match in AFC CUP 2015. 
 In period, January 2015 - May 2015, Ayeyawady United FC, under him, successfully played in Myanmar National League 2015 and AFC CUP 2015, with unbeaten record of 15 official matches in row.  
 In September 2015, second time under him, Ayeyawady United FC, become Champion, Winner the Myanmar National Cup 2015 (General Aung San Shield 2015), and qualified to play in AFC CUP 2016, in Group Stage.
 Marjan Sekulovski, with this big success, become the most successful football Head Coach in New Professional Myanmar Football History, with 3 Myanmar Cup Champion titles, in last 3 seasons.
 Marjan Sekulovski stay in Ayeyawady United FC until January 2016.
 In January 2016 Marjan Sekulovski signed the contract with Yangon United FC, Myanmar.
 In February 2016, Marjan Sekulovski with his new team Yangon United FC, first time in history played second preliminary round qualifications match in Asian Champions League 2016 (ACL 2016)
 Since February 2016 until May 2016, Marjan Sekulovski with Yangon United FC take a part in AFC CUP 2016 (group stage) in Group G.
 Marjan Sekulovski stay in Yangon United FC until end of the June 2016. At the time when he leave the team, Yangon United FC were at Second (2) position in MNL 2016 and already qualified in Semifinal in Myanmar National Cup 2016.
 In December 2016, Marjan Sekulovski sign the 10 months contract for full season 2017 with Maziya Sports and Recreation Club FC, Maziya S&RC one of the most famous and respectable club in Maldives and current Champion of Maldives.
 In February 2017, Marjan Sekulovski with Maziya Sport & Recreation Club FC, winn the Super Cup of Maldives 2017 (Charity Shield 2017) and become the Champion of the Maldivian Super Cup 2017.
 In April 2017, Marjan Sekulovski write his name in Maldivian football history and with Maziya Sport & Recreation Club FC achieve the biggest international success for Maziya Sport & Recreation Club FC, because for the very first time one Maldivian football team defeated one Indian football team in India and for the first time after 13 years one Maldivian football team defeated one Indian football team .(19.04.2017, AFC Cup, Mohun Bagan FC 0 - 1 Maziya Sport & Recreation Club FC) and (03.05.2017, AFC Cup, Maziya Sport & Recreation FC 5 - 2 Mohun Bagan FC).
 Since February 2017 until May 2017 Maziya Sport & Recreation Club FC play AFC Cup 2017 group stage in Group E. Maziya Sport & Recreation Club FC with 12 points shared the first place in Group E with Bengaluru FC from India who was 2016 season AFC Cup runners up what is the best team record ever in team history. 
 Marjan Sekulovski with this success for second time write his name in Maldivian football history and make the historical result with his team because first time in team history Maziya Sport & Recreation Club FC collected 12 points in AFC Cup competition with records of 4 wins, 0 draws, 2 lost, and positive + 6 goal difference with 10 scored goals and 4 conceded goals in 6 games.
 In July 2017, Marjan Sekulovski with Maziya S& RC FC win the STO MALE LEAGUE 2017 and become the Champion of the Maldivian National League 2017.
 Marjan Sekulovski stay in Maziya S&RC FC until of the end of his 10 months contract at 31 October 2017.
 In January 2018, for the fourth time as a head coach, he come back in FK Pelister from Bitola, Macedonian First League, Pelister, Macedonian First League, to help to the team to survive in the most difficult moment in the team history .
 Marjan Sekulovski stay in FK Pelister until 20 April 2018. He leave the club at the moment when FK Pelister was already qualified for the final game of the National Cup of Macedonia 2018 (finalist of the National Cup of Macedonia 2018).
 In April 2018 Marjan Sekulovski sign the contract with Shan United from Myanmar. He sign the short term (5 months) contract until end of the season 2018 (30 September 2018). Shan United was the League and Cup Champion of the Myanmar for season 2017 . But in season 2018, their performance are very poor, and they are currently at the fourth (4) position at standing table in MPT MNL 2018 .
 In September 2018 Marjan Sekulovski as Head Coach with Shan United from Myanmar become the Vice Champion (1 Runners up - Second position) of the MPT Myanmar National League 2018 with unbeaten record of 13 official matches in row in MPT MNL 2018 (10 win and 3 draw games), and also with unbeaten record of 15 official matches in row in all competitions (11 win and 4 draw games), and qualified to play in AFC CUP 2019, in Group Stage .
 Marjan Sekulovski stay in Shan United until of the end of his 5 months contract at 30 September 2018.
  In April 2019, Marjan Sekulovski for second time come back and sign the 12 months (1 year) contract for full season 2019/2020 with Maziya Sports and Recreation Club FC,  Maziya S&RC one of the most famous and respectable club in Maldives.
 Under Marjan Sekulovski Maziya S&RC FC already got two historical records in the Dhiraagu Dhivehi Premier League season 2019/2020.
 The biggest win in Maldivian National League history, Maziya 13 : 0 Nilandhoo (25 June 2019).
 The fastest goal in  Maldivian National League history, Asadhulla Abdhulla scored at 15th seconds, Maziya 9 : 0 Victory (3 August 2019).
 On 19 January 2020, Marjan Sekulovski with his Maziya S&RC FC became the Champions of the Dhiraagu Dhivehi Premier League (Maldives National League Champion) for season 2019/2020 confirming the Premier League Champion Title three games before the end of the League competition.
 Under Marjan Sekulovski, Maziya S&RC FC made a big success in the AFC CUP 2020 Qualification Round, defeating Abahani Dhaka FC (Bangladesh) last season AFC CUP 2019 Inter Zonal Semifinalist, 2:2 in Dhaka (Bangladesh) on 5 February 2020, and 0:0 in Male (Maldives) on 12 February 2020. 
 Under Marjan Sekulovski, Maziya S&RC FC made a big and tremendous achievement with qualifying for AFC CUP 2020 Group Stage, defeating Bengaluru FC (India) last season Indian Super League 2019 Champion and AFC CUP 2016 finalist, 2:1 in Male (Maldives) on 19 February 2020 and 1:2 after full time ; 2:3 after extra time ; 4:3 after penalties in Bangalore (India) in Play-Off round on 26 February 2020.
 On 2 March 2020, Marjan Sekulovski with his Maziya S&RC FC become crowned as the Champions of the Dhiraagu Dhivehi Premier League (Maldives National League Champion) for season 2019/2020.
 Marjan Sekulovski stayed in Maziya S&RC until the end of his 15 months contract on 1 July 2020.
 In November 2020 Marjan Sekulovski signed a long term contract until June 2022 as head coach with Bregalnica Štip from Мacedonia.
 In May 2021, under Marjan Sekulovski as head coach Bregalnica Štip become Champion of the Macedonian Second League 2020-2021, with an unbeaten record of 27 official matches in a row in Macedonian Second League 2020-2021, 23 W / 4 D / 0 L.
 On January 10, 2022, Marjan Sekulovski canceled his contract and left the Bregalnica Štip because of private reasons even his contract expires in June 2022. At the moment of leaving the team Bregalnica Štip were at 4 position on the standing table of the I MFL with 29 points from 18 games.
 On January 20, 2022, Marjan Sekulovski signed the long term contract until June 2023 with his home city team Pelister, Macedonian First League.
 On January 25, 2023, Marjan Sekulovski canceled his contract and left the Pelister even his contract expires in June 2023. At the moment of leaving the team Pelister were at 4 position on the standing table of the Macedonian Second League 2022-2023 with 30 points from 15 games .

Achievements 

HEAD COACH AWARDS / ACHIEVEMENTS :

 CHAMPION - NATIONAL LEAGUE (5) : 2005/2006 ; 2011/2012 ; 2017 ; 2019/2020 ; 2020/2021
 CHAMPION - NATIONAL CUP (3) : 2003/2004 ; 2012 ; 2015
 CHAMPION - NATIONAL SUPER CUP (2) : 2015 ; 2017
 RUNNERS UP - NATIONAL LEAGUE (4) : 2001/2002 ; 2002/2003 ; 2003/2004 ; 2018
 RUNNERS UP - NATIONAL CUP (1) : 2017/2018
 RUNNERS UP - NATIONAL SUPER CUP (1) : 2013
 AFC CUP - GROUP STAGE (5)  : 2013 ; 2015 ; 2016 ; 2017 ; 2020
 AFC CUP - ROUND OF 16 (1) : 2015
 ACL - SECOND PRELIMINARY ROUND (1) : 2016
 AFC CUP - CHAMPION / WINNER AT QUALIFICATIONS ROUND/STAGE FOR AFC CUP 2020 IN SOUTH ASIA ZONE (1) : 2020
 AFC CUP - CHAMPION / WINNER AT PLAY OFF ROUND/STAGE FOR AFC CUP 2020 IN SOUTH ASIA ZONE (1) : 2020

HEAD COACH AWARDS / ACHIEVEMENTS :

 2001 / 2002 - FC "PELISTER" - BITOLA (YOUTH TEAM U - 15) - RUNNER UP - MACEDONIA NATIONAL YOUTH LEAGUE (U – 15);
 2002 / 2003 - FC "PELISTER" - BITOLA (YOUTH TEAM U - 16) - RUNNER UP - MACEDONIA NATIONAL YOUTH LEAGUE (U – 16);
 2003 / 2004 - FC "PELISTER" - BITOLA (YOUTH TEAM U - 17) - RUNNER UP - MACEDONIA NATIONAL YOUTH LEAGUE (U – 17);
 2003 / 2004 - FC "PELISTER" - BITOLA (YOUTH TEAM U - 17) - CHAMPION / WINNER - MACEDONIA NATIONAL CUP; 
 2005 / 2006 - FC "PELISTER" - BITOLA (MACEDONIA) - CHAMPION / WINNER - I PLACE - PROMOTION IN I MFL; 
 2006 / 2007 - FC "PELISTER" - BITOLA (MACEDONIA) - 1 / 2 FINAL MATCH - MACEDONIA NATIONAL CUP;
 2009 / 2010 - UEFA PRO DIPLOMA / LICENCE - FOOTBALL HEAD COACH - GRADUATION;
 2011 / 2012 - FC "PELISTER" - BITOLA (MACEDONIA) - CHAMPION / WINNER - I PLACE - PROMOTION IN I MFL; 
 2012 - "AYEYAWADY UNITED FC" (MYANMAR) - CHAMPION / WINNER - MYANMAR NATIONAL CUP 2012 (MFF DIGICEL CUP 2012);
 2013 - "AYEYAWADY UNITED FC" (MYANMAR) - RUNNER UP - MYANMAR SUPER CUP 2013 (MFF CHARITY CUP 2013); 
 2013 - "AYEYAWADY UNITED FC" (MYANMAR) - AFC CUP 2013 - GROUP STAGE;
 2014 - THE BEST MACEDONIAN COACH ABROAD - AWARDED FROM FOOTBALL FEDERATION OF MACEDONIA; 
 2015 - "AYEYAWADY UNITED FC" (MYANMAR) - CHAMPION / WINNER - MYANMAR SUPER CUP 2015 (MFF CHARITY CUP 2015); 
 2015 - "AYEYAWADY UNITED FC" (MYANMAR) - AFC CUP 2015 - PASS THE GROUP STAGE AND QUALIFIED TO PLAY 1/8 FINAL IN AFC CUP 2015;
 2015 - "AYEYAWADY UNITED FC" (MYANMAR) - CHAMPION / WINNER - MYANMAR NATIONAL CUP 2015 (GENERAL AUNG SAN SHIELD 2015);
 2016 - "YANGON UNITED FC" (MYANMAR) - ASIAN CHAMPIONS LEAGUE 2016 - SECOND PRELIMINARY STAGE;
 2016 - "YANGON UNITED FC" (MYANMAR) - AFC CUP 2016 - GROUP STAGE;
 2017 - "MAZIYA S & RC FC" (MALDIVES) - CHAMPION / WINNER - SUPER CUP OF MALDIVES 2017 - CHARITY SHIELD 2017;
 2017 - "MAZIYA S & RC FC" (MALDIVES) - AFC CUP 2017 - GROUP STAGE
 2017 - "MAZIYA S & RC FC" (MALDIVES) - CHAMPION / WINNER - STO MALE LEAGUE 2017 - MALDIVIAN NATIONAL FOOTBALL LEAGUE 2017;
 2017 / 2018 - "FC PELISTER" - BITOLA (MACEDONIA) - FINALIST / RUNNER UP - MACEDONIA NATIONAL CUP;
 2018 - "SHAN UNITED FC" (MYANMAR) - RUNNER UP - MYANMAR NATIONAL LEAGUE 2018;
 2019 / 2020 - "MAZIYA S & RC FC" (MALDIVES) - CHAMPION / WINNER - DDPL 2019 / 2020 - MALDIVIAN NATIONAL FOOTBALL LEAGUE 2019 / 2020;
 2020 - "MAZIYA S & RC FC" (MALDIVES) - CHAMPION / WINNER AT QUALIFICATIONS ROUND/STAGE FOR AFC CUP 2020 IN SOUTH ASIA ZONE
 2020 - "MAZIYA S & RC FC" (MALDIVES) - CHAMPION / WINNER AT PLAY OFF ROUND/STAGE FOR AFC CUP 2020 IN SOUTH ASIA ZONE
 2020 - "MAZIYA S & RC FC" (MALDIVES) - AFC CUP 2020 - GROUP STAGE
 2020 / 2021 - FC "BREGALNICA" - STIP (MACEDONIA) - CHAMPION / WINNER - I PLACE - PROMOTION IN I MFL;

References

External links

1973 births
Living people
Sportspeople from Bitola
Association footballers not categorized by position
Macedonian footballers
North Macedonia youth international footballers
FK Pelister players
FK Borec players
FK Napredok players
Macedonian football managers
FK Pelister managers
FK Sileks managers
FK Makedonija Gjorče Petrov managers
Macedonian expatriate football managers
Expatriate football managers in Myanmar
Macedonian expatriate sportspeople in Myanmar
Expatriate football managers in the Maldives